Group 2 of the UEFA Euro 1968 qualifying tournament was one of the eight groups to decide which teams would qualify for the UEFA Euro 1968 finals tournament. Group 2 consisted of four teams: Bulgaria, Portugal, Sweden, and Norway, where they played against each other home-and-away in a round-robin format. The group winners were Bulgaria, who finished 4 points above Portugal.

Final table

Matches

Goalscorers

References
 
 
 

Group 1
1966–67 in Bulgarian football
1967–68 in Bulgarian football
1966–67 in Portuguese football
1967–68 in Portuguese football
1966 in Swedish football
1967 in Swedish football
1966 in Norwegian football
1967 in Norwegian football